Sean Edward Levert (September 28, 1968 – March 30, 2008) was an American singer-songwriter and actor. Levert was best known as a member of the R&B vocal group LeVert. Levert was the son of O'Jays lead singer Eddie Levert and younger brother of singer Gerald Levert.

Life and career
Sean Levert was born in Cleveland, Ohio and was the son of Eddie Levert, the lead singer of The O'Jays. He formed the trio LeVert with older brother Gerald Levert and childhood friend Marc Gordon; together they scored several smash hits on the U.S. R&B charts in the 1980s and early 1990s. In 1995, Sean launched a solo career with the album The Other Side on Atlantic Records, which peaked at #22 on the US Billboard R&B chart and #146 on the Billboard 200. The album yielded the charting singles "Put Your Body Where Your Mouth Is" (U.S. R&B #40) and "Same One" (U.S. R&B #57) that same year. Sean and Gerald Levert appeared in the film New Jack City (1991); Sean also played a part in the direct-to-video Dope Case Pending (2000).

Personal life
Levert was married to Angela Lowe, and had six children: Shareaun Woods, Keith Potts, Sean Levert Jr., Breoni Levert, Brandon Levert, and Chad Levert. His father is the third cousin of Cleveland Cavaliers NBA star Caris LeVert. In 2008, he was sentenced to a 22–month prison sentence for failing to pay child support for three of his children, then aged 11, 15, and 17.

Health and death
Levert became ill while incarcerated in the Cuyahoga County Correctional Facility, prior to his transfer to a state prison, reporting high blood pressure and hallucinations; he died six days after being admitted to the jail, on March 30. The Cuyahoga County coroner ruled in May that his death was caused by complications from sarcoidosis. The official Coroner's report also noted contributing factors of high blood pressure, heart disease, diabetes, and withdrawal from Xanax; He was 39 years old. In 2010, his widow was awarded $4,000,000 as a result of lawsuit filed against Cuyahoga County.

Discography

 The Other Side (1995)

References

External links
 

1968 births
2008 deaths
Musicians from Cleveland
American contemporary R&B singers
Singers from Ohio
Musicians from Shaker Heights, Ohio
20th-century African-American male singers
Deaths from sarcoidosis
Deaths from diabetes
Deaths from hypertension